(born September 20, 1991) is a Japanese actor. He was born in Tokyo, Japan.

Filmography

Drama 
Sora e no tegami　(1999)
Shin tenmadetodoke 1-5 (1999-2004）
Shiawase no Shippo (2002）
Anata no Jinsei Ohakobishimasu　(2003）
Wonderful Life（2004）
The Queen's Classroom (Joō no Kyōshitsu) (2005)
The Queen's Classroom Special Episode 2 (Joō no Kyōshitsu) (2006)
Tantei Gakuen Q (2006)
Kimi ga Hikari wo Kureta (2006)
Idaten (2019), Mikio Oda

Film 
Electric Dragon 80.000 V
「戀愛撲下來了」（1999）As Junichi
「五条霊戦記」（2000）

 As a teenager
Masquerade Hotel (2019)

TV commercials / advertisements 
 Magazine Advertisement
 Bandai「WonderSwan Crystal Glass」
 Nippon Meat Packers

External links 
Matsukawa Naruki's Official Page（Central G）
Naruki Forum!（Naruki's Hong Kong Fans Forum）
naruwiki（Naruki's Japan fansite）

1991 births
21st-century Japanese male actors
Living people
People from Tokyo